"Forgive and Forget" is a song recorded by American country music artist Eddie Rabbitt and released in 1975 as the second single from his self-titled debut album. The song was written by Rabbitt and Even Stevens, and produced by David Malloy. It was Rabbitt's second country hit, reaching number 12 on the Billboard Hot Country Singles & Tracks chart.

Critical reception
On its release as a single, Cash Box wrote, "Rabbitt steps out and strikes a blow for women with this soft, easy ballad, featuring rich vocals and excellent production."

Charts

References

1975 singles
1975 songs
Eddie Rabbitt songs
Songs written by Eddie Rabbitt
Songs written by Even Stevens (songwriter)
Song recordings produced by David Malloy
Elektra Records singles